The Lo Nuestro Award for Best Merengue Performance (or Lo Nuestro Award for Merengue Artist of the Year) is an honor presented annually by American network Univision. The Lo Nuestro Awards were first awarded in 1989 and has been given annually since to recognize the most talented performers of Latin music. The nominees and winners were originally selected by a voting poll conducted among program directors of Spanish-language radio stations in the United States and also based on chart performance on Billboard Latin music charts, with the results being tabulated and certified by the accounting firm Deloitte. At the present time, the winners are selected by the audience through an online survey. The trophy awarded is shaped in the form of a treble clef.

The award was first presented to Puerto-Rican American singer Elvis Crespo in 2001. Puerto-Rican American performer Olga Tañón holds the record for the most awards with seven, out of the same number of nominations; Crespo, Tañón and Dominican singer-songwriter Juan Luis Guerra are the only performers awarded, with four, seven and three wins, respectively. Grupo Manía are the most nominated performers without a win, with six unsuccessful nominations.

Winners and nominees
Listed below are the winners and nominees of the award for each year.

Multiple wins/nominations

See also
 Grammy Award for Best Merengue Album
 Grammy Award for Best Salsa/Merengue Album
 Latin Grammy Award for Best Contemporary Tropical Album

References

Merengue Artist
Merengue music
Awards established in 2001